Samvel Yervinyan (born January 25, 1966) is an Armenian violinist and composer.

Biography 
Yervinyan was born in Yerevan, Armenia. He began studying at the age of 7 in Spenderian Music School under the tutoring of Armen Minasian. In the competitions he participated, he won all the first place prizes in his age group. He played Henry Vieuxtemps' 2nd concert on his graduation day and received a standing ovation from all the faculty members. He continued his studies at Tchaikovsky's Music Conservatory, under the guidance and tutoring of Maestro Edward Dayan. In the following years he became the professor's pride and strongest prospect for future concert violinist. At his graduation, he played several classical compositions including, Bach's Adagio and Fugue in G Minor, Mozart's violin concert No. 5 in A Major, Paganini's Caprice No. 21 in A Major, and Sarasate's Gypsy Melodies. In 1993 Yervinyan earned his PhD from Yerevan State Musical Conservatory.

Tours with Yanni

2003 and 2004 - Ethnicity world tours
2005 - Yanni Live! The Concert Event and Yanni Voices tours.
2013 - 'World Without Borders' tour
2014 - World Tour
2015 - World Tour
2018 - 25th Acropolis Anniversary World Tour
2019 - Yanni by the sea "Egypt"

References

External links
 Official Web site

1966 births
Living people
Armenian classical violinists
Musicians from Yerevan
Komitas State Conservatory of Yerevan alumni
21st-century classical violinists